Peter Andrew Jones (born 14 December 1951) is a British artist and illustrator who has produced a large number of fantasy and science fiction genre illustrations. During a professional career of over 43 years he has worked on book jacket covers, film posters, advertising, and games, as well as contributing to many BBC TV and commercial TV programs and projects.

Early life 

Peter Andrew Jones was born into the relative poverty of post-war Britain in Islington, north London, the son of Reginald and Catherine Jones, his father an engineer. Showing interest in the visual arts from an early age, he describes the London of his early boyhood as 'smog-ridden and grey' with little for children to do, and took to painting to fill time and "colour his world". He also began to develop a lifelong love of aviation and space technology encouraged by commercial Airfix kits and drawing fighter aircraft at RAF Leuchars when visiting his mother's relatives in Fife, Scotland. At school he continued to pursue his interest in art, and won numerous school prizes for his work. Many Sunday visits with his parents to London's National and Tate Galleries even before the age of twelve further fixed his interest in a future career in the field.

With the encouragement of his art tutor, Bob Spearman, Jones attended Saint Martins School of Art in London in 1970, where he studied graphic design, graduating in 1974. At the college, a visiting lecturer suggested Jones combine his interest in realism with imaginative skills, drawing Jones into the Fantasy and Science Fiction fields. Whilst at St. Martins Jones took the decision to "become an illustrator". Within a month he was producing his first commercial work for Puffin Books, the cover for Penelope Farmer's A Castle of Bone.

Career 

He commenced several decades of producing cover art for science fiction and fantasy publications. During his career he has provided book covers for science fiction and fantasy authors including Isaac Asimov, Ray Bradbury, Arthur C. Clarke, Greg Bear, Larry Niven, Philip K. Dick, Marion Zimmer Bradley and Harry Harrison. An anthology of Jones' work was published under the title Peter Jones: Solar Wind by Paper Tiger in 1980, covering his science fiction and fantasy illustrations up to the year 1980. Since 1999 he has been publishing the book himself through his current company along with several other editions including further volumes of the book.

He also produced images for film publicity, creating the movie posters for The Sword and The Sorcerer and Alligator, contributed during the early 1980s to television shows including BBC comedy The Two Ronnies Show and the BBC's '80s sci-fi adaptation of  The Tripods, and has produced cover illustrations for video game publishers such as US Gold, Psygnosis and Virgin Interactive.

Jones has worked for the Fighting Fantasy game books originated by Steve Jackson and Ian Livingstone in the 1980s, in particular providing the original cover for the first title in the series in 1982. It is often stated on the internet that the book's publishers were distressed at Jones' illustration for the cover of The Warlock of Firetop Mountain as he designed it with space for the title in the centre of the front cover, eschewing the publishing tradition of placing titles at the top of the page,; however, it was something he did after being called in to rescue the book's launch, being told by the publisher "we've no idea how to do this, we don't understand this new type of book" and was asked to "go away, and come back with something revolutionary". Inspired by the layouts of many American romance titles at the time, given to him by a Dutch editor in Rotterdam while en route to the Frankfurt Book Fair, he decided to break tradition in the UK market and use a similar layout. He provided several further pieces for the Puffin FF series, including covers for Starship Traveller, Talisman of Death, and The Riddling Reaver, as well as over twenty cover illustrations for Joe Dever's Lone Wolf game books and a number of covers for Mark Smith and Jamie Thomson's Falcon series.

Also during this time, a number of Jones' fantasy images appeared on the covers of Games Workshop's White Dwarf magazine. From covers for the magazine, Jones went on to produce game art for GW's boardgame adaptation of the first Fighting Fantasy title The Warlock of Firetop Mountain; cover art for GW's edition of Chaosium's Stormbringer RPG followed. The processes involved in Jones' production of the cover for Stormbringer were detailed in an Illuminations exposé in White Dwarf issue 90.

During the 1990s Jones further pursued his interest in aviation-related art, becoming involved with the RAF Benevolent Fund, and a number of World War II pilots. His illustrations of aircraft and aerial combat can be found in a variety of books on the subject, and his work in the field has been commended by pilots, including one-time World War II pilot George H. W. Bush.

During the late 1970s Jones set up his own design studio and licensing company, Solar Wind Ltd, based in London's Fulham Road then Wimbledon in 1980, London, to facilitate his ongoing illustration work and manage the licensing of his images. Solar Wind was closed down in the late 1990s, when he decided to develop the name for a wider remit, bringing together work in various fields. Solar Wind was transferred to Shropshire in late 1999 with Jones, from where he now operates his current company. Jones' current work includes ongoing genre and wildlife illustration, the production of handmade and self-published books, cards and prints, and occasional private commissions. He is also working on further self-published collections of his work, including Affetti, Rural Dreams, Simulacra, Tales from the wood, about the Faeries who inhabit his studio's garden, and an illustrated dark fantasy novel series titled Crux Millennium.

Style and technique 

As a child Jones enjoyed the formative influence of popular media during the 1960s, including the Eagle's Dan Dare, DC's Superman and Batman comics, and television programmes like Thunderbirds, Doctor Who and Star Trek. Later he was exposed to the rash of alternative cultural phenomena of the decade, discovering underground artists like Robert Crumb, Mick English and Martin Sharp, and Pop art such as that of Peter Blake and David Hockney. Salvador Dalí, who he considered 'science fantasy', was also a guiding influence during his early years. Whilst at college, Jones was introduced to American artists and illustrators like Norman Rockwell, Andrew Wyeth and James Bama, frequent illustrator of the Doc Savage books. Bama in particular made a lasting impact, particularly his Western genre art, and Jones still considers him both a genius and the single most major influence on his work.

Jones' science fiction and fantasy work tends to be predominated by images featuring central characters against the backdrop of other-worldly landscapes.

Jones works primarily in hand-mixed oil paint and also acrylic, using a unique painting medium he invented that he calls "acryloil". In recent years he has also adopted the use of a Macintosh computer and drawing tablet, though primarily for editorial purposes and not the creation of paintings. Jones' handmade prints, sold via his website, are sometimes embellished with gold and rare pigments such as lapis lazuli.

Cover illustrations such as that for the Stormbringer RPG are executed in alternating layers of oil and acrylic colour, including, at that time, the use of an airbrush, on an emulsion-primed hardboard support, in the case of Stormbringer, lightly dusted with plaster whilst wet and sealed with an oil wash. White Dwarf's art editor John Blanche said of Jones' take on Elric, "Peter's strong design sense and dramatic choice of colours have combined to produce the definitive image of Elric, as the battle-crazed albino, dominated by his demon sword, Stormbringer. . ."

References

External links 
 
A page on Jones at Abandonart
A page on Jones at Sci-fi-o-rama 
A page on Jones' Fighting Fantasy contributions at Gamebooks.org
A partial list of Jones' gaming credits on pen-paper.net

HWGA 5000

1951 births
English illustrators
British speculative fiction artists
Fantasy artists
Fighting Fantasy
Game artists
Games Workshop artists
Living people
Role-playing game artists
Science fiction artists